The 2001 Arab Athletics Championships was the twelfth edition of the international athletics competition between Arab countries which took place in Damascus, Syria from 2–5 October. A total of 44 events were contested. The women's heptathlon and half marathon events were not held, although one new women's event was held for the first time: the pole vault. The electronic timing system at the event failed during the competition and as a result some of the races were hand-timed. Results for all such hand timed events were recorded to the tenth of a second, rather than the hundredth of a second typically used in electronic times. The distance for the men's half marathon race was also mis-measured, falling short of the 21.1 km (13.1-mile) requirement.

Medal summary

Men

Women

Medal table

Overall

Men

Women

References

 Revue "Al Batal Al Arabi":N°:53. Arab Athletics Union.

Arab Athletics Championships
International athletics competitions hosted by Syria
Sport in Damascus
Arab Athletics Championships
Arab Athletics Championships
21st century in Damascus